Il gran mogol (The Grand Moghul), RV 431a, is a flute concerto by Antonio Vivaldi, written in the late 1720s or early 1730s. It was the Indian part of a set of four 'national' concertos, La Francia (France), La Spagna (Spain) and L'Inghilterra (England) – the other three are all lost.

It appeared in a Dutch bookseller's sale catalogue of 1759 and was then lost until 2010, when it was rediscovered by Andrew Woolley in the papers of Lord Robert Kerr (?-1746), the son of William Kerr, 3rd Marquess of Lothian, now in the National Archives of Scotland. Kerr was a flautist himself and is thought to have collected it on a grand tour of Italy. Number RV 431a has been assigned to the concerto in Ryom Verzeichnis.

External links

Flute concertos
Concertos by Antonio Vivaldi
Cultural depictions of Akbar
Works about Mughal Empire
Works about Indian history